Palatinate-Kleeburg was a state of the Holy Roman Empire, which centered on the Alsatian lordship of Kleeburg.

Palatinate-Kleeberg was the younger partition of Palatinate-Zweibrücken in 1604 for John Casimir, the youngest son of John I, Count Palatine of Zweibrücken. His marriage to Catharina of Sweden, eldest surviving daughter of King Charles IX of Sweden would eventually see his elder son and successor Charles Gustavus succeeded to the Swedish throne in 1654, giving Palatinate-Kleeburg to his younger brother Adolph John I. The Count Palatine of the line, Gustavus Samuel Leopold, inherited the Duchy of Zweibrücken and its seat in the Imperial Diet in 1718. After his death in 1731, Palatinate-Kleeburg passed to Palatinate-Zweibrücken-Birkenfeld.

House of Wittelsbach
Counties of the Holy Roman Empire